Nickelodeon is a Croatian cable and digital satellite television network dedicated to children. It was launched in December 2011. The channel broadcasts 24 hours a day. All animated dubbed into Croatian and live-action shows are subtitled into Croatian. Dubs are made by NET studio. The channel is served by the Pan-European feed.

Dubs
The channel is completely Animated series and films dubbed into Croatian. The dubs are made by NET studio.

Subs
The channel completely Live-Action series and films subtitled into Croatian.

Programming Blocks

Weekend Awesomeness
This programming block starts every Sunday at 5:00PM sati and airs special episodes and nickelodeon movies.

Saturday Marathons
This programming block starts every Saturday at 12:00PM and airs a marathon of a specific show until 3:00PM

Nick Jr
Nick Jr. is a programming block on Nickelodeon that airs pre school content.

References

External links
 Official website

Croatia
Television channels and stations established in 2011
2011 establishments in Croatia
Television channels in Croatia
Croatian-language television stations